Voxx may refer to:
 Voxx (album), a 1980 album by Bay City Rollers
 Voxx International, an American consumer electronics company
 Voxx Records, subsidiary of Bomp! Records

See also
Vox (disambiguation)